The 1990 480 km of Monza was the second round of the 1990 World Sportscar Championship season, taking place at Autodromo Nazionale Monza, Italy.  It took place on April 29, 1990.

Official results
Class winners in bold.  Cars failing to complete 75% of the winner's distance marked as Not Classified (NC).

† - #20 Team Davey was disqualified for being underweight in post-race inspection.

Statistics
 Pole Position - #1 Team Sauber Mercedes - 1:29.165
 Fastest Lap - #2 Team Sauber Mercedes - 1:33.426
 Average Speed - 210.532 km/h

External links
 WSPR-Racing - 1990 Monza results

Monza
6 Hours of Monza
Monza